The 1912 Five Nations Championship was the third series of the rugby union Five Nations Championship following the inclusion of France into the Home Nations Championship. Including the previous Home Nations Championships, this was the thirtieth series of the annual northern hemisphere rugby union championship. Ten matches were played between 1 January and 8 April. It was contested by England, France, Ireland, Scotland and Wales.

Table

Results

External links

1912
Five Nations
Five Nations
Five Nations
Five Nations
Five Nations
Five Nations
Five Nations Championship
Five Nations Championship
Five Nations Championship
Five Nations Championship